Bagbazar railway station is a Kolkata Suburban Railway station in the neighbourhood of Bagbazar. It serves the local areas of Bagbazar in Kolkata, West Bengal, India. The station has two platforms. Its station code is BBR.

The station

Complex 
The platform is not very well sheltered. The station lacks many facilities including water and sanitation.  There is no proper approach road to this station. The railway station is situated adjacent to Mayer Ghat.

Layout

Connections

Bus 
Bus route number 43 serves the station.

Ferry 
Bagbazar Launch Ghat is located nearby.

Air

References

External links
 

Sealdah railway division
Railway stations in Kolkata
Transport in Kolkata
Kolkata Suburban Railway stations
Kolkata Circular Railway